Edward P. Branch (May 24, 1842 – January 6, 1937) was a one-term mayor of Melbourne, Florida from 1892 to 1893.

He came to Melbourne, Florida in 1886.
He influenced Henry Flagler to bring the Florida East Coast Railway through Melbourne.

In 1889, he organized the First Congregational Church along with his wife, and 10 others. In 1913, he was a member of the National Council of Delegates for the American Congregational Church.

After the death of Richard W. Goode in 1912, he was appointed postmaster of Melbourne.

References 

American Congregationalists
American bankers
American merchants
Mayors of Melbourne, Florida
Florida postmasters
People from Painesville, Ohio
1842 births
1937 deaths